Düzce District (also: Merkez, meaning "central") is a district of the Düzce Province of Turkey. Its seat is the city of Düzce. Its area is 710 km2, and its population is 258,484 (2022).

Composition
There are three municipalities in Düzce District:
 Beyköy
 Boğaziçi
 Düzce

There are 96 villages in Düzce District:

 Akbıyıklar
 Aktarla
 Akyazı
 Altınpınar
 Asar
 Aybaşı
 Aydınpınar
 Aynalı
 Bahçeköy
 Ballıca
 Bataklıçiftlik
 Bostanlık
 Büyükaçma
 Çakırhacıibrahim
 Çalıcuma
 Çamlısu
 Çınardüzü
 Çınarlı
 Çiftlikköy
 Dağdibi
 Derdin
 Develi Besni
 Doğanlı
 Duraklar
 Düverdüzü
 Düzköy
 Eminaçma
 Erdemli
 Esençam
 Esentepe
 Eski Mengencik
 Fındıklıaksu
 Gökçe
 Gölormanı
 Güldere
 Gümüşpınar
 Günbaşı
 Gündolaması
 Güven
 Hacıahmetler
 Hacıaliler
 Hasanlar
 Hatipliketenciler
 Hocaoğlu
 İhsaniye
 İslahiye
 İstilli
 Kabalak
 Kadıoğlu
 Kaledibi
 Karadere
 Kavakbıçkı
 Kaymakçı
 Kemerkasım
 Kirazlı
 Kızılcık
 Konaklı
 Köprübaşı
 Kozluk
 Küçükahmet
 Küçükmehmet
 Kurtsuyu
 Kuşaçması
 Kutlu
 Mamure
 Muncurlu
 Muradiyemengencik
 Musababa
 Nasırlı
 Nuhlar
 Osmanca
 Otluoğlu
 Ovapınar
 Ozanlar
 Özyanık
 Paşakonağı
 Paşaormanı
 Pınarlar
 Samandere
 Sancakdere
 Şaziye
 Sinirci
 Suncuk
 Taşköprü
 Turaplar
 Üçyol
 Uğur
 Yaka
 Yayakbaşı
 Yayla
 Yeni Aynalı
 Yeni Karaköy
 Yeni Taşköprü
 Yeşilçam
 Yeşilçimen
 Yörük

References

Districts of Düzce Province